Thomas J. Murrin (April 30, 1929 – January 30, 2012) was an American businessman who served as the United States Deputy Secretary of Commerce from 1989 to 1991.

He died on January 30, 2012, in Pittsburgh, Pennsylvania at age 82.

References

1929 births
2012 deaths
United States Deputy Secretaries of Commerce
Pennsylvania Republicans